Shannon Johnson may refer to:

 Shannon Johnson (basketball) (born 1974), American basketball player
 Shannon Johnson (murderer) (1983–2012), American convicted murderer

See also
 Shannon Johnston (born 1958), American bishop of the Episcopal Church